Hamza Mohammad Bogary or Boqari (1932–1984) was an Arabic author from Mecca who also worked in broadcasting, becoming Director General of Broadcasting; from 1965 to 1967, he served as Saudi Arabia's Deputy Minister of Information. In 1967, he became a cofounder of King Abdulaziz University in Jeddah. Of his writings, the best known outside of Arabia is his "lightly fictionalized memoir" Saqifat al-Safa, translated into English as The Sheltered Quarter: "His descriptions of school and family life resemble closely what we know of a male student's rounds in eighteenth-century Mecca. The book is a Meccan bildungsroman, calling up those final days before the oil boom that transformed Saudi Arabia and the Hajj."

Bibliography
 Bogary, Hamza. The Sheltered Quarter, trans. Olive Kenny and Jeremy Reed, University of Texas Press, 1991: .

References

1932 births
1984 deaths
People from Mecca
Saudi Arabian writers